Amphixystis anachoreta is a moth of the family Tineidae. It was described by Edward Meyrick in 1921 and is found in Zimbabwe.

This species has a wingspan of 9mm. Its forewings are glossy light greyish-ochreous; markings formed by dark fuscous irrorations.
.

Related pages
List of moths of Zimbabwe

References

Endemic fauna of Zimbabwe
Hieroxestinae
Moths described in 1921
Moths of Africa